Bahar Toksoy Guidetti (born 6 February 1988) is a Turkish volleyball player. She currently plays for Türk Hava Yolları SK. She plays for the Turkish national team.

Career

Club career
With VakıfBank, she won the gold medal at the 2010/2011 CEV Champions League. They also finished second in their domestic league losing in the final to Fenerbahçe. Bahar won the silver medal at the 2011 FIVB Women's Club World Championship in Doha, Qatar with them and was awarded Best Server of the tournament. In 2011/2012 season, VakifBank did not advance to the Final Four of the CEV Champions League but they beat Fenerbahçe in the semifinal of the Turkish League before losing to Eczacıbaşı VitrA in the final. Toksoy won the gold medal at the 2013 Club World Championship playing with Vakıfbank Istanbul.

In 2015, she played for Italian volleyball team, Savino Del Bene Volley.

In 2016, she was transferred to Eczacıbaşı VitrA. On 20 January 2017 she signed a contract with Fenerbahçe until the end of the 2017–18 season.

National Team
Bahar competed for Turkey at the 2008 World Grand Prix where they finished 7th and at the 2009 European Championship where they ended 5th. In 2010, she helped her team win the 6th place at the World Championship in Japan. In 2011 they lost to Serbia in the final of the European League and a few months later they also lost to Serbia in the semifinal of the European Championship but managed to beat Italy to win the bronze medal. She was this tournament's best server. 2012 was the best season so far for the Turkish National Team as they secured a spot at the 2012 Olympic Games in London.

Personal life
Bahar was born in Izmir, Turkey. She recalls being interested in games involving balls. Her childhood consisted of fond memories of being sick too often. It was believed that sports made her immune system better.
On 20 September 2013 she married Giovanni Guidetti, coach of her team Vakıfbank.
They started a summer volleyball academy for girls.

Awards

Individual
 2011 FIVB World Grand Prix European Qualification "Best Blocker"
 2010-11 CEV Champions League preliminaries "Best Blocker"
 2011 European Championship "Best Server"
 2011 FIVB Women's Club World Championship "Best Server"
 2012-13 Turkish League Final Series "Best Blocker"

National team
2009 Mediterranean Games - 
2010 European League - 
2011 European Championship - 
2012 FIVB World Grand Prix - 
2013 Mediterranean Games -

Clubs
 2007-08 Challenge Cup  Champion, with VakıfBank Güneş Sigorta Türk Telekom
 2010–11 CEV Champions League -   Champion, with VakıfBank Güneş Sigorta Türk Telekom
 2011 FIVB Women's Club World Championship -  Runner-Up, with VakıfBank Türk Telekom
 2011-12 Turkish Women's Volleyball League -  Runner-Up, with Vakıfbank Spor Kulübü
 2012-13 Turkish Cup -  Champion, with Vakıfbank Spor Kulübü
 2012–13 CEV Champions League -  Champion, with Vakıfbank Spor Kulübü
 2012-13 Turkish Women's Volleyball League -  Champion, with Vakıfbank Spor Kulübü
 2013 FIVB Women's Club World Championship -  Champion, with Vakıfbank Spor Kulübü

See also
Turkish women in sports

References

External links
 
 
 
 

1988 births
Living people
Turkish women's volleyball players
Karşıyaka volleyballers
Yeşilyurt volleyballers
VakıfBank S.K. volleyballers
Eczacıbaşı volleyball players
Fenerbahçe volleyballers
Sportspeople from İzmir
Olympic volleyball players of Turkey
Volleyball players at the 2012 Summer Olympics
Mediterranean Games medalists in volleyball
Mediterranean Games silver medalists for Turkey
Competitors at the 2009 Mediterranean Games
Competitors at the 2013 Mediterranean Games
Expatriate volleyball players in Italy
Turkish expatriate sportspeople in Italy
Turkish expatriate volleyball players